Aesthetic Perfection is an American-Austrian electronic musical project created by Daniel Graves in 2000. It was formed in Los Angeles, California before moving to Linz, Austria.

Biography
Aesthetic Perfection was formerly signed directly to Metropolis Records in the United States and Out of Line Records in Europe, until Graves decided to run it on his independent label Close to Human Records. Additionally, the band was licensed to Gravitator Records in Russia and Death Watch Asia in Japan.

The band's third album, All Beauty Destroyed, was released on November 4, 2011, in Europe and November 8, 2011, in the United States.

On March 29, 2019, Aesthetic Perfection released its sixth album, Into the Black. Unlike previous albums which were released by labels, Into the Black was self-released. According to Graves, this was an intentional move towards running the band free of label intervention, due to a belief that the label industry model was "dying".

Band members
 Daniel Graves - vocals, keyboards, programming (2000–present)
 Joe Letz - live drums (2018–present)
 Constance Antoinette Day - live keyboards, guitars, bass (2018–present)

Former members
 Tim Van Horn - live drums (2009-2017)
 David Dutton - live keyboards (2008-2010, 2014-2017)
 Elliott Berlin - live keyboards (2010–2020), guitars, bass (2019–2020)

Discography

Studio albums

Extended plays

Singles

Music videos

Other appearances

Remixes

References

2000 establishments in California
American electronic body music groups
American industrial music groups
American musical trios
Austrian electronic music groups
Austrian industrial music groups
Austrian musical trios
Electro-industrial music groups
Electronic music groups from California
Musical groups established in 2000
Musical groups from Los Angeles